Komsomol is a rural locality (a village) in Yangatausky Selsoviet, Salavatsky District, Bashkortostan, Russia. The population was 221 as of 2010. There are 12 streets.

Geography 
Komsomol is located 13 km north of Maloyaz (the district's administrative centre) by road. Iltayevo is the nearest rural locality.

References 

Rural localities in Salavatsky District